Lake Kapowsin  is a lake in Pierce County, Washington, about halfway between Tacoma on Puget Sound, and Mount Rainier in the Cascade Mountains. A small island, Jaybird Island, lies in the northern half of the lake. As indicated by a drowned forest in the lake and other evidence, the Puyallup River was inundated about 550 years ago by a lahar from Mount Rainier called the Electron Mudflow. The mudflow partially filled the channel (leading to its shallow, smooth bottom today) and blocked Ohop Creek's outlet, forming present-day Lake Kapowsin.

The Tacoma Rail shortline runs along the west side of the lake, as does Orville Road connecting Eatonville to the south with the town of Kapowsin.

The lake contains a number of fish species and is stocked with rainbow trout, rated "excellent" for fishing by Washington Department of Fish and Wildlife, as is the yellow perch.

References

Further reading

Lakes of Washington (state)
Lakes of Pierce County, Washington